The 2017–18 NBA G League season was the 17th season of the NBA G League (formerly the NBA D-League), the minor league for the National Basketball Association (NBA). It is the first season after the league rebranded to become the NBA G League as part of multi-year partnership with Gatorade.

The Austin Spurs won the league title, sweeping Raptors 905 in the NBA G League Finals.

League changes
The league expanded to a record 26 teams from 22 teams during the 2016–17 season. There was one relocation (Erie BayHawks to Lakeland, Florida to become the Lakeland Magic) and four expansion teams introduced this season (the Agua Caliente Clippers, a new Erie BayHawks, the Memphis Hustle, and the Wisconsin Herd), each owned and affiliated with an NBA team. The Iowa Energy were purchased by the Minnesota Timberwolves at the end of the previous season and rebranded as the Iowa Wolves. The Miami Heat purchased the controlling interest in the Sioux Falls Skyforce, their affiliate since 2013. The Los Angeles D-Fenders also relocated to a new facility within El Segundo and were rebranded as the South Bay Lakers. The purchases and expansion of these teams by individual NBA teams left just four NBA teams without a developmental affiliate, down from eight the previous season. It also decreased the number of independently owned D-League/G League teams from seven to four. Meanwhile, the NBA also started using two-way contracts for their team rosters, allowing players to be more easily called up or sent down.

The league retained its Eastern and Western Conferences, but realigned each conference into three divisions each. Along with the league expansion, the league also expanded its playoff field from eight teams to twelve. Each of the division winners and three wild cards per conference qualify. The top two seeds in each conference earn a bye over the first round.

The NBA announced a title sponsorship deal with Gatorade prior to the season, under which it has been renamed the NBA G League. The G League also experimented with new broadcast arrangements, including airing 120 games on Eleven Sports, and streaming games on the typically video game-oriented live streaming service Twitch, which included interactive stats, and commentary provided by prominent Twitch personalities.

Regular season
Finals standings.

x – qualified for playoffs; y – Division champion; z – Conference champion

Eastern Conference

Atlantic Division

Central Division

Southeast Division

Western Conference

Midwest Division

Pacific Division

Southwest Division

Playoffs
For the fourth time ever and first time since the 2014 playoffs, a team went undefeated in postseason play to win the championship.  The Austin Spurs won the G League Finals over Raptors 905 by scores of 105-93 and 98-76 to win the title.

Statistics

Individual statistic leaders

Individual game highs

Team statistic leaders

Player death 
On March 24, 2018, Grand Rapids Drive player Zeke Upshaw collapsed on-court during the final minute of the team's regular season finale. Two days later, Upshaw died at the age of 26. Autopsy reports indicated that Upshaw had died from a sudden cardiac arrest. The start of the NBA G League playoffs were delayed out of respect for Upshaw's death, and the NBA's Detroit Pistons gave Upshaw an honorary call-up to their roster.

References

External links
Official website